Codium lucasii is a species of seaweed in the family Codiaceae.

It is found in the lower eulittoral and upper sublittoral zone in rough to moderate water coasts.

In Western Australia is found along the coast in the Gascoyne and Mid West regions extending along the south coast and along the east coast of Queensland and the northern coast of Tasmania.

References

lucasii
Plants described in 1935